The 2017 Pinty's All-Star Curling Skins Game was held from February 3 to 5 at The Fenlands Banff Recreation Centre in Banff, Alberta.

Men

Teams

Team Jacobs
Soo Curlers Association, Sault Ste. Marie, Ontario

Skip: Brad Jacobs
Third: Ryan Fry
Second: E. J. Harnden
Lead: Ryan Harnden

Team McEwen
Fort Rouge Curling Club, Winnipeg, Manitoba

Skip: Mike McEwen
Third: B. J. Neufeld
Second: Matt Wozniak
Lead: Denni Neufeld

Team Koe
The Glencoe Club, Calgary, Alberta

Skip: Kevin Koe
Third: Marc Kennedy
Second: Brent Laing
Lead: Ben Hebert
Team Edin
 Karlstads Curlingklubb, Karlstad, Sweden
	
Skip Niklas Edin
Third Oskar Eriksson
Second Rasmus Wranå
Lead Christoffer Sundgren

Results
All times listed in Mountain Standard Time.

Semifinals
Edin vs. Koe
Saturday, February 4, 9:00 am

Jacobs vs. McEwen
Saturday, February 4, 5:00 pm

Final
Sunday, February 5, 1:00 pm

Winnings
The prize winnings for each team are listed below:

Women's

Teams

Team Carey
The Glencoe Club, Calgary, Alberta

Skip: Chelsea Carey
Third: Amy Nixon
Second: Jocelyn Peterman
Lead: Laine Peters
Team Jones
St. Vital Curling Club, Winnipeg, Manitoba

Skip: Jennifer Jones
Third: Kaitlyn Lawes
Second: Jill Officer
Lead: Dawn McEwen
Team Sweeting
Saville Sports Centre, Edmonton, Alberta

Skip: Val Sweeting
Third: Lori Olson-Johns
Second: Dana Ferguson
Lead: Rachelle Brown
Team Muirhead
Dunkeld Curling Club, Pitlochry, Scotland

Skip: Eve Muirhead
Third: Anna Sloan
Second: Vicki Adams
Lead: Lauren Gray

Results
All times listed in Mountain Standard Time

Semifinals

Carey vs. Jones
Friday, February 3, 6:00 pm

Muirhead vs. Sweeting
Saturday, February 4, 1:00 pm

Final

Jones vs Sweeting
Sunday, February 5, 9:00 am

Winnings
The prize winnings for each team are listed below:

Notes

References

2017 in Canadian curling
Curling in Alberta
TSN Skins Game
Pinty's All-Star
Banff, Alberta
February 2017 sports events in Canada